Drina mavortia is a butterfly in the family Lycaenidae. It was described by William Chapman Hewitson in 1869. It is  endemic to the Philippines in the Indomalayan realm.

References

External links
"Drina de Nicéville in Marshall & de Nicéville, 1890" at Markku Savela's Lepidoptera and Some Other Life Forms

Drina (butterfly)
Butterflies described in 1869
Butterflies of Asia
Taxa named by William Chapman Hewitson